Bantayan, officially the Municipality of Bantayan,  is a 1st class municipality in the province of Cebu, Philippines. According to the 2020 census, it has a population of 86,247 people, making it the island's most populous town as well as the largest.

Geography
Bantayan is located on Bantayan Island,  from Cebu City. 

It is bordered to the north by the town of Madridejos, to the southwest is the Tañon Strait, to the east is the town of Medellin and to the south is the town of Santa Fe.

Barangays
Bantayan comprises 25 barangays:

GK Village

Gawad Kalinga has a village in brgy Mojon.

Climate

Demographics

Economy

Transportation

For short journeys within population centres, then trisikads are readily available. They are available only where land is flat and level.

For longer journeys, such as from the municipal centre to outlying barangays, then motor tricycles are available.  Smaller ones are motorcycle-sidecar combinations, and can carry about 4 passengers.  Larger ones, known as multis, have some sort of saloon behind the driver, and are usually shared between as many as eight passengers, plus some goods stowage.

For the longest journeys, such as from Santa Fe ferry pier into downtown Bantayan and onwards, there are larger jeepneys, which can carry around 20 passengers with rooftop goods stowage.

There is no public bus service as such.

Heritage

There are a few historically notable buildings but they have generally not been well maintained, and the ravages of the climate hasten decay, together with several major fires, which consume the wooden structures. Preventive maintenance generally was not practised, so even the best preserved buildings date back only to the middle of the 19th century.

Parish church of Sts Peter and Paul

The main church stands on the principal plaza.  Since the arrival of the Spanish there have been several buildings on its site: originally it was little more than a bamboo and nipa structure, which was burned down during one of the Moro raids.  This was replaced by another wooden structure, which also burned down.  Construction of the present building (the fifth on the site) started in 1839.  The main driving force was the parish priest Padre Doroteo Andrade del Rosario and the maestro de obras (master of works) was his nephew Manuel Rubio y del Rosario (also known as ).  Construction lasted about 24 years.  The principal building material is coral, sawn to approximately parallelepiped shape and dressed like stone.

Since mid–2012 refurbishment work has been in progress: the belfry has been restored to its former glory, and  there are plans to open it for tourist access.  The stairs are very steep and not very well guarded, however it does offer an elevated panoramic view of the waterfront.

The church also houses a small museum, visiting by appointment.

D.C. Abello theater

 it is some sort of warehouse for glass and windows.

The building was entirely demolished in early 2015 to make way for the island's first supermarket development.

Houses

Central plaza was the location of several well-built houses.  Opposite the church Manuel del Rosario built two which used to be "the grandest homes on Bantayan island".  Originally pre-dating the church, one was used as the Casa de Mamposteria (house of masons) during construction of the church.  The main house was later inherited by the son of del Rosario and his second wife, while the house next door was their wedding gift to their daughter.

After subsequent bequests, ownership of both houses was shared by many scions of the Causing and Escario families.  They were unable to decide on (or maybe fund)   any necessary preventive maintenance work.   both houses have more or less collapsed in ruins past repair.  All that remains of Bantayan's former glory is a dangerous and unsightly collection of rotten beams, collapsed walls and broken tiles occupying a prime and valuable location. Typhoon Yolanda subsequently caused both ruins to collapse entirely.

Recreation

There are no longer any public entertainment centres such as cinemas.  Apart from religious fiestas and processions, the main Bantayanon enjoyment comes from karaoke (known as videoke).  Many households have their own equipment, but for special occasions they hire equipment with truly prodigious output, especially with low frequency sound.  This is likely to be placed in the street, for the enjoyment of all the neighbourhood.

Beach

Much of the municipality coastline is unsuitable as a beach - there is no real sandy area, mostly rocks or mud, all along the southern coast of the municipality, and the western coast almost as far north as Baod and Patao.  There are better beaches on the eastern coast, but access is difficult.

Sillon and Baigad is where good beaches can be found – wide expanses of sand, clean sea and few bathers.  However these too have plenty of detritus and flotsam – for the most part seaweed and vegetation from the coconut palms which line the shore.  The beaches are almost completely undeveloped, so no facilities, and there are several large private properties which are built close to the shore line.

Attractions

Private facilities which are open to the public include:
 Casa de Antiguedades – This is a private house whose owner is happy to show visitors some of the artefacts and objects he has collected over the years.  No entrance fee, but a contribution to upkeep is appreciated.
Oboob Mangrove Garden – established by the residents of brgy Oboob, the garden offers visitors a tour into the mangal forest along an elevated bamboo trail.
St Helena Botanical Garden shows off a selection of exotic flowers and fruits.
Bantayan Nature Park –  (2012) place does not (yet) live up to its name.

Cockfighting

As is common throughout the Philippines, 'sport' is synonymous with cock-fighting.  There is a large sports centre (cockpit) on the road to Santa Fe, which attracts a large clientele in Sundays.  In addition, puroks can have their own arena, usually just a piece of land set aside for the purpose.

Festivals and processions

The Holy Week observance attracts large numbers of local and foreign tourists to the foot processions on Maundy Thursday and Good Friday, when life-sized images and icons are mounted on carrozas (floats) decorated in a carnival style that depict various tableaux of Christ's Passion and the Stations of the Cross.

Palawod is another festival held 29 June in honour of Sts. Peter & Paul .  The street dancing and ritual showdown competitions which depict the fishing traditions of Bantayan have contributed to Palawod's being the 3-times Grand Champion of the Pasigarbo sa Sugbo Festival of Festivals.

Sinulog takes place at the end of January, when there are ten or more days of noisy celebration.

Notable personalities

Archbishop John F. Du – current archbishop of the Roman Catholic Archdiocese of Palo in Leyte
Trizer D. Mansueto – historian

Gallery

See also

List of political families in the Philippines
Political dynasties in the Philippines

References

Sources

Further reading

External links

 [ Philippine Standard Geographic Code]

Municipalities of Cebu